The Secretary of Internal Affairs of Pennsylvania was a constitutional officer of the Commonwealth of Pennsylvania from 1875 until 1968. The position was created in the Pennsylvania Constitution of 1874, and was elected statewide every four years until 1966. The position was repealed on May 16, 1967. The secretary's duties were described as follows:

The Secretary of Internal Affairs shall exercise all of the powers and perform all the duties of the Surveyor General, subject to such changes as shall be made by law. His department shall embrace a bureau of industrial statistics, and he shall discharge such duties relating to corporations, to the charitable institutions, the agricultural, manufacturing, mining, mineral, timber and other material or business interests of the State as may be prescribed by law. He shall annually, and at such other times as may be required by law, make report to the General Assembly.

List of Secretaries

References